The Catalina 36 is a family of American sailboats that was designed by Frank Butler and Gerry Douglas for cruising and first built in 1982. A Mark II version was introduced in 1994 and produced until 2005.

The design was replaced in the line by the Catalina 375 in 2008.

Production
The design was built by Catalina Yachts in the United States, with 2305 built in total, but it is now out of production.

Design
The Catalina 36 is a recreational keelboat, built predominantly of fiberglass, with wood trim. It has a masthead sloop rig, a raked stem, a raised reverse transom, an internally mounted spade-type rudder controlled by a wheel and a fixed fin keel or wing keel. All fin keel models displace  and carry  of ballast, while wing keel models displace .

Both models offered an optional tall rig for sailing in areas with light winds. The tall rig is approximately  higher that the standard rig.

Variants
Catalina 36
This model was designed by Frank Butler and introduced in 1982. A total of 1766 examples were produced. The boat is fitted with an inboard engine.

Catalina 36 Mark II
This model was designed by Frank Butler and Gerry Douglas, introduced in 1994 and was produced until 2005. The Mark II uses the same hull design and rig, but has a larger cockpit, different cabin ports, a walk-through transom and a new deck and interior design.

Operational history
A 2012 review by naval architect Jack Hornor wrote, "With nearly 3,000 boats sold over the first 26 years, the Catalina 36 is arguably the most popular sailboat of this size ever built ... All things considered, the pros certainly outweigh the cons for anyone looking for an affordable cruising boat in the 36-foot size range."

In a 2015 review of the Mark II in Sailing magazine, writer Bob Pingel stated, "the Catalina 36 hits a sweet spot among weekend cruisers. It’s big enough to be comfortable and capable, but small enough to easily manage it shorthanded and it comes at an approachable price."

Jake Firth of Sailing Today did a review of the Mark II. He praised the cockpit size, cabin and the handling, but faulted the high prices the used boats fetch, the lack of cabin top winches and lack of accessible stowage. He wrote, "there’s the common concern that anything built in volume is likely to be cheap and nasty with poor standards of fit, finish and standard equipment. Well, I had a good poke around Katie, Derek Savage’s 2006 C-36 MkII, and though some of the plywood hidden inside drawers and the like wasn’t the closest grained, best quality stuff I’ve ever seen, the bits that really cost and matter, like deck hardware and rigging, appeared to be of ample size and reasonable quality."

See also
List of sailing boat types

Similar sailboats
Bayfield 36
Beneteau 361
C&C 36-1
C&C 36R
C&C 110
Columbia 36
Coronado 35
CS 36
Ericson 36
Frigate 36
Hinterhoeller F3
Hunter 36
Hunter 36-2
Hunter 36 Legend
Hunter 36 Vision
Invader 36
Islander 36
Nonsuch 36
Portman 36
S2 11.0
Seidelmann 37
Vancouver 36 (Harris)
Watkins 36
Watkins 36C

References

External links

Keelboats
1980s sailboat type designs
Sailing yachts
Sailboat type designs by Frank Butler
Sailboat type designs by Gerry Douglas
Sailboat types built by Catalina Yachts